István Kozma may refer to:
István Kozma (footballer) (born 1964), Hungarian former footballer
István Kozma (wrestler) (1939–1970), Hungarian wrestler